Jackson Township is a township in Crawford County, Iowa, USA.  As of the 2000 census, its population was 180.

Geography

The stream of Beamon Creek runs through this township.

Transportation
Jackson Township contains one airport or landing strip, Lawler Landing Strip.

References
 USGS Geographic Names Information System (GNIS)

External links
 US-Counties.com
 City-Data.com

Townships in Crawford County, Iowa
Townships in Iowa